Trevor George Dodds (born 26 September 1959) is a Namibian professional golfer.

Dodds was born in Windhoek, South West Africa. He turned pro in 1985. He won the Canadian Tour Order of Merit in 1995 and 1996. Dodds has compiled 13 wins on four different tours: the PGA Tour, Nationwide Tour, Sunshine Tour and the Canadian Tour.

Professional wins (13)

PGA Tour wins (1)

PGA Tour playoff record (1–0)

Sunshine Tour wins (3)
1988 Goodyear Classic
1990 Protea Assurance South African Open, Trustbank Tournament of Champions

Buy.com Tour wins (3)

Canadian Tour wins (6)

Results in major championships

CUT = missed the half-way cut
"T" = tied

Team appearances
World Cup (representing Namibia): 1996, 1997

See also
1985 PGA Tour Qualifying School graduates
1986 PGA Tour Qualifying School graduates
1988 PGA Tour Qualifying School graduates
1990 PGA Tour Qualifying School graduates
1992 PGA Tour Qualifying School graduates
1997 Nike Tour graduates
2003 PGA Tour Qualifying School graduates

References

External links

Namibian male golfers
Lamar Cardinals golfers
Sunshine Tour golfers
PGA Tour golfers
PGA Tour Champions golfers
Korn Ferry Tour graduates
White Namibian people
Namibian people of British descent
Sportspeople from Windhoek
Golfers from St. Louis
1959 births
Living people